Tetragonula carbonaria (previously known as Trigona carbonaria) is a stingless bee, endemic to the north-east coast of Australia. Its common name is sugarbag bee. They are also occasionally referred to as bush bees. The bee is known to pollinate orchid species, such as  Dendrobium lichenastrum, D. toressae, and D. speciosum. It has been identified as an insect that collects pollen from the cycad Cycas media. They are also known for their small body size, reduced wing venation, and highly developed social structure comparable to honey bees.

Tetragonula carbonaria forms honeycombs in their nests. The bee produces an edible honey; the whole nest is sometimes eaten by Indigenous Australians. The bees "mummify" invasive small hive beetles (Aethina tumida) that enter the nest by coating and immobilising the invaders in wax, resin, and mud or soil from the nest.

Stingless bees
Twenty-one genera of stingless bees (family Apidae) are described worldwide. As the name would suggest, the stings of these bees are vestigial and useless in defence. About 14 species are found in Australia, mostly in the tropical north.  T. carbonaria is one of the few exceptions, in which they are found as far south as Bega in southern New South Wales. Stingless bees and honey bees are thought to have evolved from a common ancestor, like bumblebees, which would explain their similarities in social behaviour. Some of these similarities are co-operative brood care, and having different castes of queens, workers, and drones. The workers are infertile females, while the drones are males.

Taxonomy and phylogeny 
The eusocial stingless bees (Apidae, Apinae, Meliponini) comprise about 374 species. Two genera occur in Australia, with Tetragonula being one of them. The Tetragonula species of Australia were once in the larger genus Trigona, but were moved into a new genus in 2013. Only minor structural differences are seen at the species level of the genus Tetragonula. T. carbonaria is nearly identical to T. hockingsi, besides a few differences in their nest architecture.

Description

Bees

Compared to other stingless bees, T. carbonaria tends to be medium-sized. However, their size can vary based on location. For instance, T. carbonaria from Queensland can be as small as T. mellipes, but in New South Wales, they can get as large as T. hockingsi. They are all predominantly black-bodied, covered in microscopic hairs. The adult workers and males are all black, with some brownish tint in certain areas such as the legs. The worker’s body length is 3.9-4.3 mm, and the wing length (including tegula) is 4.1-4.6 mm. The male drones have very similar bodies and wing lengths, but can be identified by different antennae. T. carbonaria is a very strong flier, being able to fly up to 1 km. However, the species will not fly any further than they have to, so close resources are preferred over those farther away.  T. carbonaria and its closely related species have high levels of morphological similarities. Also very low genetic variation exists within T. carbonaria. T. carbonaria can be distinguished from other species of Australian Native Stingless Bees by their brood (in a distinctive spiral unique to the species), and by the entrance (these bees tend to daub resins around their entrances, where as other species, such as T. hockingsi generally keep their entrances clean.

Nest structure 

The entrance and surrounding areas of their nest are coated with a smooth, thick layer of black, red, or yellow cerumen or propolis, a material formed by mixing beeswax (a glandular secretion of worker bees) with resin (collected from plants).  They lack external entrance tunnels, but do build internal entrance tunnels where guard bees patrol, looking out for any intruders (including Small Hive Beetle, Phorid Fly, and other bees). T. carbonaria builds brood cells arranged in combs or semicombs. The cells are a single layer of hexagonal combs that are built in a distinctive spiral. They are vertically elongated and in a regular vertical orientation. They are built out of brown cerumen, and house the eggs and larvae. New cells are added to the brood by the advancing front. The nest cavity may be sealed off from adjoining cavities by a hard bitumen layer of cerumen or field-collected material. The brood chamber is centred in the hive, which makes T. carbonaria suitable for hive propagation. The brood chamber is also made up of multiple horizontal layers which allow for easy division of the brood comb.

Distribution and habitat 

The nests are found in open forests and woodlands. They are usually built in tree cavities, and have small cryptic entrances, with no external entrance tube. Four or five workers are usually visible at the entrance and are expected to be guards. They tend to choose larger trees and wider cavities to produce insulation valuable for their survival in the cool regions. Some features that would favour survival in a cooler climate are a high tree height and large feeding pots. The nesting sites of T. carbonaria are located near the top tree trunks that are 1.5 m in diameter, and are predominantly found in trees that are well insulated.  Members of T. carbonaria also create the largest honey and pollen pots compared to the other species of the genus Tetragonula, which may help with efficient food storage. In urban and suburban areas, T. carbonaria have been found to nest in Telstra pits as well as water meters when other habitat is not available.

Colony cycle

Activity
Colonies of T. carbonaria tend to be active all year round. The daily activity period, however, is longer in the southern hemisphere's warmer months, October to March. The intensity of these daily flights is greatest in September, and least intense in May. A temperature threshold exists on all of this activity. Flight can only occur at temperatures greater than 18 °C. This year-long period of activity is beneficial for the pollination of crops flowering at any time of the year.

Initiation
Each brood cell is stocked almost to the brim with honey and pollen. An egg is laid in the cell by the queen and then the cell is closed. Complete larval and pupal development occurs in the closed cell . Once the adult emerges, the cell is destroyed.  Most stingless bee species are monogynous, meaning that when the colony divides, one of the daughter colonies will be queenless. T. carbonaria colonies are frequently divided by beekeepers to increase the number of colonies. They build emergency queen cells by fusing two worker-sized cells that contain eggs or young larvae.

The queens cannot live alone and they are not transferred to a new nest until it has been fully prepared by workers.  The new queen is the bee that makes the flight to the new nest, with the old queen remaining in the parent nest. When the old queen has died, mating swarms can occur at the established nest to replace the old queen with a young, unmated one.

Growth
A study performed by Tim Heard in 1988 observed the propagation of hives in T. carbonaria. He successfully transferred colonies to boxes, and then once the available space was occupied, he would split the box by prying apart the two halves of the box. He recorded that colony weight increased much more in spring and summer compared to autumn and winter. After about 17 months, the final weight was established. The rate at which colony weight increases is dependent on the availability of nectar and pollen, not age (however, it usually takes 12 to 18 months for a hive to be ready to be propagated). A heavy hive suggests filled storage pots and a large population of workers and brood, meaning the hive is ready to be split.

Behaviour

Division of labour
Division of labour exists among the workers. The young bees perform tasks within the nests, such as brood care.  As they mature, they become foragers and their tasks are performed outside of the nest.

Foraging behaviour
T. carbonaria depends on nectar and pollen for survival. They also collect resin for use in the nest structure. Workers tend to exhibit characteristics of group-foraging behaviour called "opportunism". In short, opportunism is when many foragers search for resources independently, and once they find a highly resourceful flower, they rapidly recruit nest mates. In other words, they are optimising the feeding intake of the colony. The success in this practice is dependent on chance. If a forager encounters an area full of rich resources, then recruitment and harvesting are extremely heavy in this area until the resources are depleted. Workers look for areas with the highest sugar concentration in the nectar, as they have the ability to physiologically identify the richest sugar solutions. As more nest mates arrive to the area with rich resources, the availability of this high-concentration sugar decreases to a point where moving onto another area that might be lower in concentration is best. In T. carbonaria colonies, only some of the bees do the foraging. Workers spread out in all directions surrounding the colony, and  quickly locate the best option nearest the nest. Once this area is found, they mark the food sources with a pheromone. Marking is used as a guide to make the location easier to find for their nest mates.

Reproduction

A study used microsatellites to determine the origin of males. The resident queen was the sole mother of the males. This meant that the workers did not contribute to the production of males. Ovaries were sometimes present in the workers, but not activated. This is unusual because most stingless bee workers can produce unfertilized eggs that develop into haploid males, therefore having both the queen and the workers with potential to be the mother of the males in the colony. This is also unusual because usually some sort of kin-selected benefits towards worker reproduction exist. One possibility could be that the queens have power over their workers. The aggressive oviposition can sometimes be seen as the queen "bullying" the other party into refraining from reproduction. However,  very little queen-worker agonism occurs during oviposition in T. carbonaria.  Another possibility could be some sort of "evolutionary arms race" between workers and queens over which the caste has power to produce males. This could depend on some extrinsic factors such as the size of the colonies, the number of brood cells available for oviposition, and size dimorphism of queens and workers. A final possibility could be that workers have evolved to "self-restrain" from egg-laying because worker reproduction creates a significant cost to the colony. Some of these costs could be low reproductive success of worker-laid males or reduced colony productivity since the workers now have to focus on reproduction instead of colony maintenance.

Kin selection

Genetic relatedness within colonies
The workers tend to be the progeny of a singly mated queen. The colonies are predominantly haploid males which arose from queen-laid eggs. Mating frequency is a central factor in kin selection arguments.  Some cases are seen of diploid males, which are generally sterile and are considered to have a very low fitness. Diploid males tend to have a cost to the colony because diploidy can result in a reduced proportion of workers able to perform their tasks, which is pivotal to the colony’s survival. In some extreme cases, workers have been reported to kill a queen producing diploid males, to help the future success of the colony.

Worker-queen conflict
When workers do lay eggs, direct conflict tends to occur within the colony between the queen and the workers over the source of male eggs. Queen-worker conflict is found in cell provisioning and the oviposition process of most stingless bee species. This conflict is usually very elaborate, and very apparent, but tends to not involve acts of aggression, which other species of stingless bees have been known to perform. Although worker oviposition is known to be controlled by worker policing, it can sometimes be controlled through queen dominance/policing. This is where the queen patrols the area where new brood cells are being produced, being able to have a hands-on policing which tends to be quite effective.

Interaction with other species

Defence
When the colonies are attacked, nest defence relies on the ability to recognise intruders. T. carbonaria sometimes displays a behaviour known as a "fighting swarm" when a non-nest mate is encountered. Thousands of workers gather together and form a cloud. The signal to form this cloud is most likely mediated by alarm pheromones, which workers release from their mandibular glands. As one entity, they drop to the ground and wrestle the intruders, which often leads to death of both parties. This behaviour is also a common defence mechanism against large predators such as humans. T. carbonaria bees are highly sensitive to intruders, since they will even attack invaders that are carrying pollen or nectar. Even if an intruder found a way to make it past the swarm, it still would not make it through the congested entrance tunnel.

Predators
One predator known to attack T. carbonaria is an Australian crab spider, Diaea evanida. This organism is able to exploit the interaction between plants and their pollinators, something investigated by one scientific study. These crab spiders attract and ambush pollinators on flowers. They produce UV-reflective body colours that attract prey to the flowers they are occupying. However, Australian native bees are able to detect and avoid flowers harbouring crab spiders despite the fact that they are initially attracted to them. Diaea evanida spiders can generate colour contrasts for bees’ individual preferences, but T. carbonaria did not show any preference for any of the contrasts.

Parasites
The braconid subfamily Euphorinae has several genera, including Syntretus, known to be parasitoids of the adult stage of insects. They are a highly diverse group and tend to be very successful parasitoids worldwide. A new species of Syntretus, S. trigonaphagus, has recently been discovered as parasitizing workers of T. carbonaria. Females of S. trigonaphagus are frequently found at the entrances of T. carbonaria hives near Queensland, Australia. They approach workers that land nearby and oviposit on the host by curling their abdomens. The workers repeatedly brush their abdomens afterwards, suggesting that they were aware that an attack occurred. The overall effect of this parasitism is usually fatal. Older workers are more likely to be parasitized. Because of this, as long as the number of parasites is minimal, the overall cost to the colony is not large, since these workers have already contributed substantially to the colony’s welfare.

Importance to humans

Beekeeping

Meliponiculture is the practice of stingless beekeeping, where beekeepers maintain, reproduce, and use stingless bee colonies for their own profit. These colonies tend to be managed through artificial hives, so that the beekeepers have the ability to propagate the colonies and produce hive products such as honey and pollen. These products are then sold to various buyers from health-food stores to gift shops. The honey of T. carbonaria possesses a peculiar smell which makes it quite the appealing product.  When the first work began in 1984 on this stingless bee, the industry was practically nonexistent. Since then, the interest in stingless bees, more specifically T. carbonaria, has greatly increased. This has allowed for the establishment of conservation groups along the eastern regions of Australia. T. carbonaria is the most popular species that beekeepers tend, followed by the A. australis and then T. hockingsi. The main reason for most people to keep T. carbonaria is for enjoyment and conservation. With this, the amount of honey produced is constantly increasing at a fast pace. T. carbonaria is the main species from which beekeepers harvest honey, of the stingless bees in Australia. Beekeepers report that one of the major limiting factors in propagating colonies is the availability of queens. More research is needed on queen rearing to fix this limiting factor.

Agriculture (as pollinators)
Individual T. carbonaria bees demonstrate a consistency in floral choice. Individuals restrict their foraging activity to one kind of flower during a particular trip. 
This consistency in a single pollen type enhances the pollinator efficacy by increasing the chances of pollen being transferred to stigmata of the same plant species. This increases their importance ecologically as crop pollinators. At the level of the colony, however, the species can use many different flowering species. So although the species is polylectic, individual bees remain consistent with their flower choice.

Honey
Meliponines store their honey in pots, not in combs like the honey bees. 
Compared to the honey of the Western honey bee A. mellifera, T. carbonaria honey had higher values in moisture, water activity, and  electrical activity. The two different honeys can also be distinguished by flavor and aroma. Also, the antioxidant activity of T. carbonaria honey has nutritional and  pharmaceutical potential.

References

Further reading

 
 

Meliponini
Hymenoptera of Australia
Orchid pollinators
Insects described in 1854